Napoleon B. McPhetridge was a lawyer, county examiner, and state senator in Arkansas. He was elected in 1880.

The Arkansas Digital Archive has a vertical file on him.

References

External links
Findagrave entry

Arkansas state senators
Year of birth missing
Year of death missing
19th-century American politicians
Arkansas lawyers
19th-century American lawyers